Tarhun may refer to:

 Tarhun, the Hittite thunder god, known to the Hurrians as Teshub.
 Tarhun (drink)